SK Jedinstvo Beograd was a Serbian football club based in Belgrade, Kingdom of Yugoslavia.

History
Jedinstvo was formed on May 11, 1924 by the merger of two Belgrade clubs, Vardar and Konkordija, both of which competed in Belgrade Subassociation League until that year. They received the field of SK Srpski mač for use from the Belgrade municipality. At first their shirts were white with purple stripes but soon afterwards they changed to fuchsia, then green, and since then they became known as "Zeleni", The Greens in Serbian. Jedinstvo became one of the most important clubs in Belgrade during the pre-1945 period, right along BSK, SK Jugoslavija and BASK.

It competed in the Yugoslav First League in the seasons 1937–38, finishing 8th, and in the season 1938–39, when it finished on 6th. Due to the reduction of the number of clubs in the league from 12 to 6, it did not participate in the 1939–40 season which was the last before the beginning of the Second World War that would lead to the creation of a separate Croatian and Serbian Championships. As result, in 1940–41 a so-called Serbian League was played with Jedinstvo finishing in 4th place.

With the intensification of the war, and the following change of regime, the club ended up being disbanded in 1945.

Honours
Belgrade Subassociation League:
 1938

Notable players

Capped by the Yugoslav national team:

Aleksandar Aranđelović
Prvoslav Dragičević
Mija Jovanović
Mihalj Kečkeš
Petar Lončarević
Milutin Pajević
Branislav Sekulić
Ljubiša Stefanović
Ivan Stevović
Slavko Šurdonja
Aleksandar Tomašević

 Anton Kuzmanov

For all former club players with Wikipedia article, please see: :Category:SK Jedinstvo Beograd players.

References

Defunct football clubs in Serbia
Football clubs in Yugoslavia
Association football clubs established in 1924
Association football clubs disestablished in 1945
Football clubs in Belgrade
1924 establishments in Serbia
1945 disestablishments in Serbia
Stari Grad, Belgrade